Françoise Mbango Etone (born 14 April 1976 in Yaoundé) is a Cameroonian-born female track and field athlete. She has competed internationally for France since 2010. While competing for Cameroon, Etone was a 2-time Olympic gold medalist in the triple jump at the 2004 Olympic Games in Athens, Greece and 2008 Olympic Games in Beijing, China. She held the Olympic record for triple jump which she set with a distance of 15.39 m at the Beijing Olympics in 2008.  The 15.39 m is the third longest women's triple jump in history under any conditions.  Only 25 women have ever jumped 15 metres, Etone jumped beyond 15 metres on 7 of her last 11 attempts in the Olympic final alone.

Etone was also a talented long jumper who finished second at the African Championships in 1999. Etone was the first female athlete representing Cameroon to win medals at the Commonwealth Games, World Championships and Olympic Games. She has been a scholarship holder with the Olympic Solidarity program since November 2002.

During the 2005–06 academic year, she lived in New York City on a scholarship to attend St. John's University in Queens, New York.  The scholarship was made possible through the collaboration of the American electricity company AES Sonel along with US Ambassador to Cameroon, Niels Marquardt.  She selected St. John's University for study (along with her younger sister, Berthe) because of the school's support of cultural programs in Cameroon.

Competition record

References

External links 
 
 
 

1976 births
Living people
Cameroonian female triple jumpers
French female triple jumpers
Olympic athletes of Cameroon
Olympic gold medalists for Cameroon
Olympic gold medalists in athletics (track and field)
Athletes (track and field) at the 2000 Summer Olympics
Athletes (track and field) at the 2004 Summer Olympics
Athletes (track and field) at the 2008 Summer Olympics
Medalists at the 2004 Summer Olympics
Medalists at the 2008 Summer Olympics
World Athletics Championships athletes for Cameroon
World Athletics Championships medalists
Commonwealth Games silver medallists for Cameroon
Commonwealth Games medallists in athletics
Athletes (track and field) at the 1998 Commonwealth Games
Athletes (track and field) at the 2002 Commonwealth Games
African Games gold medalists for Cameroon
African Games medalists in athletics (track and field)
Athletes (track and field) at the 1999 All-Africa Games
Cameroonian emigrants to France
Sportspeople from Yaoundé
Medallists at the 1998 Commonwealth Games
Medallists at the 2002 Commonwealth Games